Bupleurum baldense, the small hare's ear, is a plant species of the genus Bupleurum.

External links

baldense